The National Movie Awards (NMA) was a British film awards ceremony broadcast by ITV in which the winners of the awards were chosen via popular vote. The awards were initiated in 2007 following the success of the National Television Awards, the highest-rating awards ceremony for television. The first three ceremonies were held at the Royal Festival Hall in London, with the fourth and final (to date) ceremony taking place at Wembley Arena, London.

Winners and nominations

1st NMA (2007)
The first award ceremony was held on 28 September 2007, presented by Alexander Armstrong.

2nd NMA (2008)
The second award ceremony was held on 8 September 2008, presented by James Nesbitt.

3rd NMA (2010)
The third award ceremony was held on 26 May 2010, was presented for the second time by James Nesbitt and was shown live on ITV for the first time ever (the first 2 ceremonies went out pre-recorded).

4th NMA (2011)
The fourth award ceremony was held on 10 May 2011, presented by Christine Bleakley. This was the final ceremony to date. JLS, Eliza Doolittle and Take That performed.

Notes

References

External links
 National Movie Awards

Award ceremonies
Awards established in 2007
Awards disestablished in 2011
Annual television shows
British film awards
ITV (TV network) original programming